Deepak Sawant is a member of Maharashtra Legislative Council, belonging to the Shiv Sena. He represents the Mumbai graduate constituency. He was elected to office in July, 2006 for a term of six years and then reelected in July 2012. However he was denied a spot on the ticket in his third election bid.  He was appointed Maharashtra's cabinet minister of in December, 2014 with the portfolio Public Health and Family Welfare. Later in the same month, he was also given responsibility of being guardian minister of Bhandara district and Dharashiv District.

Positions held
 2004: Elected to Maharashtra Legislative Council
 2006: Re-Elected to Maharashtra Legislative Council
 2012: Re-Elected to Maharashtra Legislative Council
 2014: Cabinet Minister of Public Health and Family Welfare in Maharashtra State Government
 2014: Guardian minister of Bhandara district, Osmanabad District and Aurangabad District

See also
 Devendra Fadnavis ministry

References

External links
 Official website
 Shiv Sena Home Page
 http://www.rediff.com/news/report/fadnavis-ministry-expansion-sees-mix-of-old-and-new-faces/20141205.htm
 http://www.dnaindia.com/mumbai/report-maharashtra-cm-devendra-fadnavis-team-portfolios-allocated-bjp-retains-key-departments-2041510

Shiv Sena politicians
Members of the Maharashtra Legislative Council
State cabinet ministers of Maharashtra
Living people
Year of birth missing (living people)